The 2011–12 Fortuna Düsseldorf season is the 117th season in club history. The season started on 18 July against VfL Bochum.

Review and events

Overview of season
Fortuna Düsseldorf became the most successful Herbstmeister ("Autumn champion") in 2. Bundesliga history after earning 41 points from 17 matches. The 41 points accumulated is the most in history since the three-point system was introduced in 1995. Düsseldorf lost their first six matches in 2010–11 season. since then, they've earned 94 points which is most out of all professional football clubs in Germany.

Hertha BSC vs. Fortuna Düsseldorf

The matches
Fortuna Düsseldorf won a spot in the promotion/relegation playoff against the Bundesliga's Hertha BSC.

First leg
Entering the playoff, Fortuna Düsseldorf had not played in the top flight for 15 seasons. They won the first leg against Hertha BSC 1–2 in Berlin's Olympic Stadium with goals from Thomas Bröker and an own goal from Hertha's Adrián Ramos.

Second leg
In the return leg in Düsseldorf, both teams drew 2–2; Fortuna Düsseldorf won on aggregate 4–3. However, the match's second half was marred by trouble, first after Hertha supports threw flares onto the pitch after Fortuna scored its second goal of the night to go up 2–1. The other problem was when several Fortuna supporters ran onto the field with around one minute remaining in the match. It took 21 minutes to restore order and stoppage time ended up being 28 minutes by the time the final whistle blew. With Fortuna winning the two-legged affair, they secured a return to the Bundesliga after 15 seasons.

The appeal
Hertha BSC appealed the result of the match. The German Football Association (DFB) met on 18 May 2012 to discuss the incidents of the second leg. Campino, singer for Die Toten Hosen, called Hertha BSC's protest "indecent". The hearing at the DFB lasted for six hours. The panel's decision will not be known until a further meeting on Monday. It is expected to make a decision at 15.00 CET. The German Football Association stated that any possible disciplinary action against either club or any of the players will be taken at a later date. The players being investigated are Levan Kobiashvili, Christian Lell, Thomas Kraft and Andre Mijatović. Second leg referee Wolfgang Stark was a key witness at the first hearing. Fortuna canceled a planned trip to Mallorca due to the hearing on 21 May 2012.

Sports law expert Michael Lehner said that Hertha can hope for replay after the second leg of the promotion/relegation playoff. Lehner went on to state, "Is not the game has been properly placed on the principle of equal opportunity at the end there was a break in terms of game development," and, "The team of Hertha BSC through the fault of third parties a real opportunity has been deprived of the game even. get why there should be a replay from a legal point of view."

The sports court of the DFB ultimately rejected Hertha's appeal, with Hertha ordered to pay the cost of the proceedings. Hertha then appealed the decision of the DFB's sports court. The sports DFB court president Hans Eberhard Lorenz stated, "The appeal was unsuccessful, because no ground of opposition was to prove the referee has traded at any time conform to the rules, and the alleged Hertha BSC-sided weakness due to the interruption could not be proven..." He also stated that, "There was no Berlin players injured or assaulted or were needed to be replaced. Had this been the case, the objection would have been done." The Federal Court of the German Football Association confirmed the Sports Court decision. Hertha can appeal the decision to the Sports Court for Arbitration. After the final verdict, Hertha players went on vacation, while Fortuna players were not immediately released for vacation.

The disciplinary panel of the DFB decided that Fortuna must play their first home match of next season behind closed doors as a result of their fans running onto the field during the second leg of the promotion/relegation playoff. The club was also sanctioned with a six-figure fine.

Other incidents
Another incident, as reported by Die Welt the next day, was that Hertha players attacked second leg referee Wolfgang Stark. Stark pressed charges against an unknown player for assaulting him off the field. Hertha apologized for the conduct of some of the club's players. The decision on the misconduct of Kobiashvili, Lell, Kraft and Mijatović are due later this week. The four players are accused of verbally and physically harassing the referee. Fortuna's Andreas Lambertz is also being investigated. He celebrated with a torch in his hand after the match.

Match results

Legend

2. Bundesliga

Regular season

1.Match times before 30 October and after 24 March are played in Central European Summer Time. Match times from 30 October to 24 March are played in Central European Time.
2.Fortuna Düsseldorf goals listed first.

Promotion playoff
As third-place team, Fortuna Düsseldorf faces the 16th-placed 2011–12 Bundesliga side in a two-legged play-off. Hertha BSC finished in 16th place. The winner on aggregate score after both matches will earn a spot in the 2012–13 Bundesliga.

Dates and times of these matches were determined by the Deutsche Fußball-Liga as following:

DFB-Pokal

Player information

Roster and statistics

Sources

Match reports

Other sources

Fortuna Düsseldorf seasons
Fortuna Dusseldorf